Tjideng was a Japanese internment camp for women and children during the Second World War, in then Batavia (today Jakarta, Indonesia).

Batavia came under Japanese control in 1942, and part of the city, called Camp Tjideng, was used for the internment of European (often Dutch) women and children. The men and older boys were transferred to other camps, many to prisoner of war camps.

Initially Tjideng was under civilian authority, and the conditions were bearable. But when the military took over, privileges (such as being allowed to cook for themselves and the opportunity for religious services) were quickly withdrawn. Food preparation was centralised and the quality and quantity of food rapidly declined. Hunger and disease struck, and because no medicines were available, the number of fatalities increased.

The area of Camp Tjideng was over time made smaller and smaller, while it was obliged to accommodate more and more prisoners. Initially there were about 2,000 prisoners and at the end of the war there were approximately 10,500, while the territory had been reduced to a quarter of its original size. Every bit of space was used for sleeping, including the unused kitchens and waterless bathrooms.

From April 1944 the camp was under the command of Captain Kenichi Sonei, who was responsible for many atrocities. After the war Sonei was arrested, and sentenced to death on September 2, 1946. The sentence was carried out by a Dutch firing squad in December of that year, after a request for pardon to the Dutch lieutenant governor-general, Hubertus van Mook, was rejected. Van Mook's wife had been one of Sonei's prisoners.

In literature

Dutch author Jeroen Brouwers described his childhood experience in the camp, and its later effects, in the 1986 autobiographical novel Bezonken Rood, translated into English as Sunken Red. The French translation won the Prix Femina in 1995.

Clara Olink Kelly in her 2003 book The Flamboya Tree, and Boudewijn van Oort in his 2008 Tjideng Reunion, describe life and conditions in the camp, and van Oort also describes in some detail the military and diplomatic background. Henri Charles Schmid describes the life of his mother during her imprisonment in the Tjideng camp in his 2014 book Scattered Journey. Robine Andrau in her 2015 book Bowing to the Emperor: We Were Captives in WWII, coauthored with her mother, describes both their experience in the camp and her father's experience as a POW in Japan.

References

 Boudewijn van Oort, Tjideng Reunion (2007,

External links
Peter van der Kuil: Tjideng Camp 
3 min. 48 sec. video of Tjideng internment camp after liberation 

Japanese prisoner of war and internment camps